Pasilaid or Pasja is an island belonging to the country of Estonia.

See also
 List of islands of Estonia

References

Further reading
 Tiit Leito: Vormsi piirkonna saared. In: Maakillud meres. Eesti väikesaared. Varrak, 2015  pp. 192–195
 Ivar Arold: Eesti maastikud. Tartu Ülikooli, Tartu 2005  pp. 334f
 Madis Kanarbik: Ormsö. De estlandssvenska böndernas kamp mot godsägarna under 1700- och 1800-talet (= Nordistica Tartuensia. vol. 9). Tartu Ülikooli, Tartu 2003 

Islands of Estonia
Vormsi Parish